The Cricket on the Hearth is a 1909 silent short film directed by D. W. Griffith. It is based on the 1845 novella of the same title by Charles Dickens.

Synopsis
Opening in the home of Caleb Plummer, an old toymaker, we see his son, Edward, departing for the sea. A tender farewell to father and blind sister, Bertha, takes him to the road where he bids adieu to his sweetheart, Mary Fielding. There is then a lapse of three years and we find honest John Pereyhingle the husband of Dot. Mrs. Fielding has gotten into moderate straits and consents to the marriage of Old Tackleton, the grouch, to May. This is repugnant to May, whose heart is set on Edward. Edward returns, stopping on the way at the King George Inn where he learns of the approaching nuptials of Tackleton and May. Borrowing a disguise from a strolling Merry Andrew, he goes in the garb of an old wayfarer on John’s cart to see Dot and find out the truth. John, prompted by Tackleton, watches the pair. Not recognising Edward, John assumes he is a lover. Edward upon learning from Dot how inimical the match is to May resolves to carry her away, which he does with the assistance of Dot. They are married in the roadway just as the much perturbed Tackleton appears. John discovers what a fool he has been in doubting Dot, Tackleton realises what an unpopular grouch he has been and decides to change, while Bertha and Old Caleb are overjoyed at the return of Edward.

Cast
Owen Moore - Edward Plummer
Violet Mersereau - May Fielding
Linda Arvidson - Sister Dorothy
Dorothy West - Sister Bertha (unconfirmed)
David Miles - Caleb Plummer
George Nichols - Mr. Fielding
Anita Hendrie - Mrs. Fielding
Herbert Prior - John Peerybingle
Mack Sennett - Merry Andrew
Harry Solter - Tackleton
John R. Cumpson - Innkeeper
Arthur V. Johnson - The Minister

See also
D. W. Griffith filmography

References

External links
 

 The Cricket on the Hearth available for free download at Internet Archive

1909 films
American silent short films
American black-and-white films
Biograph Company films
Films based on works by Charles Dickens
Films directed by D. W. Griffith
1909 short films
1900s American films